Kratochvilite is a rare organic mineral formed by combustion of coal or pyritic black shale deposits. It is a hydrocarbon with the formula of either C13H10 or (C6H4)2CH2. It is a polymorph of the aromatic hydrocarbon fluorene. It forms white, yellow to brown crystals in the orthorhombic system which occur often as a druzey encrustation. It has a specific gravity of 1.21 and a Mohs hardness of 1 to 2.

It was first described from the Nejedly mine in Bohemia, Czech Republic in 1937.

References

Organic minerals
Minerals described in 1937